Olivia Raney was a church organist and choral singer from Raleigh, North Carolina. The first public library in Wake County, North Carolina, Olivia Raney Memorial Library, is named after her.

Biography 
Olivia Raney moved to Raleigh at age 10. She lived in the Five Points neighborhood, and on McDowell Street between Edenton and Hillsborough.

She was known as an accomplished musician, and served as the organist for Christ Episcopal Church.

As a young woman, she maintained a friendship and correspondence with businessman Richard Beverly Raney, an insurance agent who became the president of the Raleigh Chamber of Commerce. Olivia was in her early thirties when she married Mr. Raney.

The couple had been married for about a year and a half, and Olivia was expecting her first child when she died suddenly, on May 4, 1896.  A local headline read, "One of Raleigh’s Most Cultured and Beloved Women Passes Away."

Her husband founded the Olivia Raney Memorial Library in her memory, which was chartered in 1899. Jennie Coffin, a close friend of Olivia Raney, became the first librarian.

References

External links 
 
Olivia Raney Local History Library

Musicians from Raleigh, North Carolina
American organists
Women organists
1861 births
1896 deaths
People from Washington, North Carolina
19th-century American musicians
19th-century organists